The 2012 Girls' Youth NORCECA Volleyball Championship was the eight edition of the bi-annual women's volleyball tournament, played by seven countries from August 6–11, 2012 in Tijuana, Baja California, Mexico. The event served as qualifier to the 2013 Girls Youth World Championship

Competing nations

Preliminary round

Group A

Group B

Final round

Championship bracket

Quarterfinals

Semifinals

Fifth place match

Bronze medal match

Final

Final standing

Individual awards

Most Valuable Player

Best Scorer

Best Spiker

Best Blocker

Best Server

Best Digger

Best Setter

Best Receiver

Best Libero

References

External links
 

Women's NORCECA Volleyball Championship
P
V
Volleyball
2012 in women's volleyball
2012 in Mexican women's sports